The 2011 Virginia Tech Hokies football team represented the Virginia Polytechnic Institute and State University in the 2011 NCAA Division I FBS football season. The Hokies were led by 25th-year head coach Frank Beamer and played their home games at Lane Stadium. They were members of the Coastal Division of the Atlantic Coast Conference. They finished the season with 11–3 overall record, 7–1 in ACC play, as champions of the Coastal Division. They were defeated by Clemson in the 2011 ACC Championship Game, 10–38. They were invited to the Sugar Bowl, where they lost to Michigan, 20–23 in overtime.

Schedule

Rankings

Coaching staff

Roster

Game summaries

Virginia

References

Virginia Tech
Virginia Tech Hokies football seasons
Virginia Tech Hokies football